Margarita Island, or similar spellings, may refer to:
 Isla Margarita, the main island of Nueva Esparta state, Venezuela
 Margarita Island (Colombia), an island in the Magdalena River, Colombia
 Isla Santa Margarita, Magdalena Bay, Baja California Sur, Mexico
 Margaret Island, or Margitsziget, in Budapest, Hungary
 Margeret Island (Panama)
 Margarita Island (Panama)